Max Waldmeier (18 April 1912 – 26 September 2000) was a Swiss astronomer, known for his research on sunspots. As director of the Zurich Observatory until 1980, Waldmeier insisted on counting sunspots by eye over automated methods, using a Fraunhofer refracting telescope installed by Zurich Observatory director Rudolf Wolf in 1849.

Legacy
Waldmeier was known for his "stubborn traditionalism" about how sunspots should be studied. He has been variously described as "one of the leading personalities in solar physics of the 20th century" and "the most arrogant astronomer in Switzerland in the mid-20th century."

References

20th-century Swiss astronomers
Academic staff of ETH Zurich
1912 births
2000 deaths